The 2021 NCAA Division III Football Championship Game, more commonly referred to as the 2021 Stagg Bowl or Stagg Bowl XLVIII, is a postseason college football game that  determined a national champion in NCAA Division III for the 2021 season. It was played at Tom Benson Hall of Fame Stadium in Canton, Ohio, on December 17, 2021. Kickoff was scheduled for 7:00 p.m. EST, and the game aired on ESPNU. The game featured the North Central Cardinals, from the College Conference of Illinois and Wisconsin, and the Mary Hardin–Baylor Crusaders, from the American Southwest Conference.

Teams
The participants of the 2021 NCAA Division III Football Championship Game were the finalists of the 2021 Division III Playoffs, a 32-team single-elimination bracket. The game featured North Central, the defending national champions after winning the 2019 Stagg Bowl, and making their second title game appearance, and Mary Hardin–Baylor, seeking their second championship (their 2016 championship victory was later vacated) in their fifth title game appearance. This contest was the first between the two teams.

National semifinals

Game summary

Statistics

References

Stagg Bowl
North Central Cardinals football
Mary Hardin–Baylor Crusaders football
American football in Ohio
Stagg Bowl
Stagg Bowl